Ralph Manning "Gus" Brown (August 2, 1885 – March 31, 1927) was an American football, basketball, and baseball coach.  He served as the head football coach at Virginia Agricultural and Mechanical College and Polytechnic Institute (VPI)—now known as Virginia Tech— in 1908, and at Colgate University in 1909, compiling career college football coaching record of 10–6–1.  Brown also coached the basketball team at Virginia Tech in 1908–09 and the baseball team there in the spring of 1909.

On March 31, 1927, Brown died in hospital after he was struck by an automobile while walking near his home.

Head coaching record

Football

References

1885 births
1927 deaths
American football ends
Basketball coaches from New Jersey
Colgate Raiders football coaches
Princeton Tigers football players
Virginia Tech Hokies athletic directors
Virginia Tech Hokies baseball coaches
Virginia Tech Hokies football coaches
Virginia Tech Hokies men's basketball coaches
Sportspeople from Elizabeth, New Jersey
Players of American football from New Jersey
Road incident deaths in New Jersey